History of Science is a peer-reviewed academic journal that covers the history of science, medicine, and technology. The editor-in-chief is Lissa L. Roberts (University of Twente). It was established in 1962 and is published by SAGE Publications.

Abstracting and indexing
The journal is abstracted and indexed in Scopus and the Social Sciences Citation Index. According to the Journal Citation Reports, its 2021 impact factor is 1.0371.

References

External links
 

SAGE Publishing academic journals
English-language journals
History of science journals
Philosophy of science journals
Publications established in 1962
Quarterly journals